Wendy Sulca Quispe (born 22 April 1996) is a Peruvian singer of Huayno music, who found fame thanks to YouTube, where her videos "La Tetita" ("The tittie"), "Cerveza, Cerveza" ("Beer, beer") and "Papito" ("Daddy") have enjoyed success.

Career
Her songs have been on TV and variety shows (such as El Francotirador with the Peruvian journalist Jaime Bayly in 2009). She appeared with the Puerto Rican group Calle 13 and had her song "Cerveza" remixed in a song with the same name with the Colombian rap group SA Finest, including the singer Jiggy Drama

In April 2010 Sulca released the song "En tus Tierras Bailaré" (In your land I shall dance) with the "YouTube stars" Delfín Quishpe and La Tigresa del Oriente. The song received attention in Latin American media and got a one million hits in a few weeks. and has been called a "Youtube We are the World" by Calle 13 singer Residente.

She was invited to participate in the music video for the song "Pal' suelo con Quique Montenegro" by Dante Spinetta along with Calle 13, Andrés Calamaro y La Tigresa del Oriente.

Wendy Sulca, in December 2010 has made the new video called, "Tetita Riquita" featuring Nicolas Forgues, a famous flute and piccolo player. The show was reviewed by the Colombian media because of the success. On 11 June 2011 Wendy Sulca performed her first tour to Chile playing in two discotheques, El Huevo in Valparaíso and Blondie in Santiago.

In an interview with the Argentinian edition of Rolling Stone, Wendy Sulca has declared that she likes the music of Reik, Panda, Luis Fonsi and Lady Gaga.

In 2018, Sulca shifts into more urban folk styles, collaborating with Mexican group Café Tacvba, and launching a World Cup-inspired song called "Boom Boom" with Quechua rapper Liberato Kani.

Critical reception
Journalist Alma Guillermoprieto has described the phenomena of Sulca and En tus Tierras Bailaré as an example of "the chaotic transformation of a culture that has always had an infinite and joyful capacity for self-invention. This not outsider but insider art of the deepest sort, forged in a hot-hot crucible, and it is we who stand on the outside, peering wistfully at the screen.".

References

External links

 Official Web

1996 births
Living people
21st-century Peruvian women singers
21st-century Peruvian singers
Andean music
Peruvian YouTubers
People from Chiclayo
Peruvian people of Aymara descent